is a railway station on the Chikuho Main Line operated by JR Kyushu in Iizuka, Fukuoka Prefecture, Japan.

Lines

Station layout 
The station, which is unstaffed, consists of a side platform serving a single track. Across the track can be seen another, disused side platform as well as the track bed of a second track which has since been removed. A siding branches off the track and ends behind the platform and is used by track maintenance equipment. A small station building built in a loghouse style serves as a waiting room. A separate weather shelter is provided on the platform itself.

Adjacent stations

History 
Japanese Government Railways (JGR) opened the station on 15 July 1928 as the new southern terminus of the then Nagao Line from Nagao (now ). On the same day, the Nagao Line was merged and became part of the Chikuho Main Line. With the privatization of Japanese National Railways (JNR), the successor of JGR, on 1 April 1987, control of the station passed to JR Kyushu.

Station numbering was introduced on 28 September 2018 with Chikuzen-Uchino being assigned station number JG03.

References

External links
Chikuzen-Uchino Station (JR Kyushu)

Railway stations in Fukuoka Prefecture